is a Japanese professional baseball pitcher for the Minnesota Twins of Major League Baseball (MLB). He previously played in MLB for the Los Angeles Dodgers and in Nippon Professional Baseball (NPB) for the Hiroshima Toyo Carp. He won the 2010 Eiji Sawamura Award with a record of 15–8 and a 2.21 ERA, with 174 strikeouts in  innings, and six complete games with two shutouts. He also became the youngest pitcher in Japanese baseball history to achieve the pitching Triple Crown in the same year. He won the Sawamura Award for the second time in 2015.

He is nicknamed "Maeken" by fans and teammates (from MAEda KENta).

Professional career

Hiroshima Toyo Carp

Maeda was selected out of PL Gakuen Senior High School by the Hiroshima Toyo Carp of Japan's 2006 NPB Draft (NPB). He played in 2007 for the Carp's secondary team, before being called up to the NPB team in 2008. In his rookie season of 2008, Maeda posted a 9–2 win–loss record with a 3.20 earned run average (ERA) in 19 games (18 starts). In 2009, he was 8–14 with a 3.36 ERA in 29 starts. In 2010, he performed even better with a 15–8 record, a 2.21 ERA, and 174 strikeouts in 28 starts. In 2011, his record was 10–12 while having a 2.46 ERA and 178 strikeouts in 31 starts. The 2012 season became far better for Maeda as his record was 14–7 with a 1.53 ERA in 29 starts. In 2013, his record was 15–7 with a 2.10 ERA in 26 starts. In 2014, he went 11–9 with a 2.60 ERA in 27 starts. In 2015, he went 15–8 with a 2.09 ERA in 29 starts. He won the Sawamura Award as the league's best pitcher in both 2010 and 2015 and was the youngest pitcher in Japanese baseball history to achieve the pitching Triple Crown. The Carp chose to make him available to Major League Baseball (MLB) teams through the posting system in December 2015.

Los Angeles Dodgers
On January 7, 2016, Maeda signed an eight-year, $25 million contract with the Los Angeles Dodgers that included $10 million per year in incentives. The deal would have reached a total of around $90.2 million throughout the course of the contract if he reached all of the incentives, which included annual roster bonus of $150,000 if he was on the 25-man opening-day active roster and $6.5 million annually based on starts: $1 million each for 15 and 20, and $1.5 million apiece for 25, 30 and 32 starts. It also had incentives of $3.5 million annually based on innings pitched: $250,000 for 90 and each additional 10 through 190, and $750,000 for 200. The deal was structured in this manner because Maeda's original physical with the team revealed some unspecified "irregularities." The Dodgers also paid a $20 million posting fee to the Hiroshima Carp.

Maeda picked up the win in his MLB debut on April 6, 2016, pitching six shutout innings against the San Diego Padres at Petco Park. His first major league strikeout was of Padres starter Andrew Cashner in the top of the second inning. He also hit a home run off of Cashner in his second at-bat for his first major league hit. He made a team high 32 starts with a 16–11 record and 3.48 ERA and was selected by Baseball America to their all-rookie team. He made three starts in the post-season for the Dodgers, losing one game in the Division Series and pitching two no-decisions in the Championship Series. He allowed eight runs in 10 innings. He finished third in the voting for the National League Rookie of the Year Award behind his teammate Corey Seager and Trea Turner of the Washington Nationals.

2017 
In 2017, Maeda began the season in the starting rotation but struggled in April and May, with a 5.16 ERA causing him to be taken out of the rotation and tried in relief. He pitched three innings out of the pen on June 9 to pick up his first career save. On June 18 he was back in the rotation and allowed only one run on three hits in five innings but he returned to the bullpen after that game because the Dodgers had too many starting pitchers on the roster. However, he only appeared in one game in relief before returning to the starting rotation and from June 18 through August 25, he had gone 8–2 with a 2.70 ERA as a starter. At the end of the season, the Dodgers moved Maeda back into the bullpen in order to try him in that role for possible use in the playoffs. Overall during the regular season he appeared in 29 games with 25 starts and had a record of 13–6 with a 4.22 ERA. He did make the post-season roster as a relief pitcher. He pitched two scoreless innings with four strikeouts in the 2017 NLDS and  three scoreless innings in the 2017 NLCS. In the 2017 World Series, which the Dodgers lost in seven games, Maeda pitched 5 innings over four games and allowed one run on four hits. Right-handed batters had just four hits in 32 at-bats against him in the post-season.

2018 
Maeda began the 2018 season in the starting rotation. He went 6–7, posted a 3.85 ERA, and averaged over 10 strikeouts per nine innings in his 20 starts. On August 14 he returned to the bullpen and made 19 relief appearances, going 2–3 with two saves while posting a 3.57 ERA. He struck out 26 batters and walked only 3 as a reliever. He finished the season 8–10 with 153 strikeouts and an ERA of 3.81 in  innings over 39 games. In the postseason Maeda made eight relief appearances, allowing 3 runs in 6.2 innings.

2019 
Maeda again began 2019 in the Dodgers starting rotation before transitioning to the bullpen at the end of the season. He made 26 starts (and 11 relief appearances), finishing with a 10–8 record and 4.04 ERA with 169 strikeouts.

Minnesota Twins
On February 10, 2020, the Dodgers traded Maeda, Jaír Camargo and cash considerations to the Minnesota Twins for Brusdar Graterol, Luke Raley and the 67th draft pick in the 2020 MLB draft.

On July 25, 2020, Maeda made his Twins debut. On August 12, he earned his 50th MLB career win.

On August 18, Maeda pitched a no-hitter through 8 innings against the Milwaukee Brewers.  He K'd 12 batters (8 consecutively, which was a new Twins record) with 2 BBs.  The no-hitter was broken by Eric Sogard, the first batter Maeda faced in the top of the 9th.

In the 2020 season, he was 6–1 with a 2.70 ERA. He led the major leagues in WHIP (0.750). He finished as the runner-up for the 2020 American League Cy Young Award behind Shane Bieber. In the 2021 season, Maeda went 6–5 with a 4.66 ERA. On September 1, 2021, it was announced that Maeda had undergone Tommy John surgery and will miss the entire 2022 season.

International career
Maeda was selected for the Japanese national baseball team at the 2013 World Baseball Classic, 2014 MLB Japan All-Star Series and 2015 WBSC Premier12.

In the 2013 World Baseball Classic, and said he would use the tournament to assess his desire to compete in MLB, based on how he fared against their hitters. Maeda started two games in the pool rounds, against China and Netherlands, amassing a 2–0 record with 0.00 ERA, 0.30 WHIP, allowing just two hits, one walk striking out 15 in 10 innings. He was the losing pitcher in the semi-finals against Puerto Rico despite only allowing one run in five innings. He was selected to the all-tournament team.

In the 2014 MLB Japan All-Star Series, Maeda pitched five shut out innings

Maeda also pitched in the 2015 WBSC Premier12 tournament, where he allowed two earned runs while striking out 14 in 12 innings.

And also, On October 29, 2018, he was selected MLB All-Stars at 2018 MLB Japan All-Star Series

Pitching style
He throws from a three-quarters arm slot and his Japanese-style windup features a slight pause at the top of his leg kick. Maeda mixes his pitches well; his four-seam fastball regularly sits in the low 90s, topping out at 96 mph (his two-seam is a tick slower), complementing it with an elite combination of an above-average slider in the low 80s and an above-average changeup.

Personal life
Maeda lives in Tokyo with his wife, Saho, daughter and son. A fan of the reality television show Terrace House since its beginning, Maeda personally asked to be a guest commentator and appeared in episode 45 of the Opening New Doors season.

See also
 List of Major League Baseball players from Japan

References

External links

NPB official site

1988 births
Living people
Baseball people from Osaka Prefecture
Hiroshima Toyo Carp players
Japanese expatriate baseball players in the United States
Los Angeles Dodgers players
Major League Baseball pitchers
Major League Baseball players from Japan
Minnesota Twins players
National baseball team players
Nippon Professional Baseball pitchers
People from Tadaoka, Osaka
Rancho Cucamonga Quakes players
St. Paul Saints players
2013 World Baseball Classic players
2015 WBSC Premier12 players